Asus Transformer is a series of 2-in-1 convertibles, detachables and hybrid tablet computers, designed and manufactured by Asus, consisting of three major lineups.

Asus Transformer Pad

Asus Transformer Book 
Asus Transformer Book is a line of detachable 2-in-1s that run Microsoft Windows.

Asus Transformer Book T100 (T100)

ASUS Transformer Book T100TA (T100TA) 
The ASUS Transformer Book T100TA is a tablet computer and docking keyboard. The tablet includes an Intel Atom Z3740 Quad Core processor running at 1.33GHz, 2GB RAM, 16GB eMMC flash memory and a 10.1" HD touchscreen. The convertible laptop computer is made by Asus and sold with the Windows 8.1 Pro operating system.

Asus Transformer Book T100 Chi (T100CHI)

Asus Transformer Book T100 Chi Signature Edition (T100CHI-D4)

Asus Transformer Book T200 (T200)

Asus Transformer Book T300 (T300)

Asus Transformer Book Trio

Asus Transformer Book Duet 

The Transformer Book Duet TD300, was a 13.3 inch tablet computer that was developed by Asus. The device used two operating systems interchangeably: Windows 8.1 by Microsoft, and Android 4.1 by Google. The device featured a tablet screen and a detachable keyboard. The device was reported to be cancelled due to opposition from both Google and Microsoft in mid-March, 2014.

Asus Transformer Book T101

Asus Transformer Mini T102

Asus Transformer Book T302

ASUS Transformer Pro T304UA

Asus Transformer Book Flip 
Asus Transformer Book Flip is a line of convertible 2-in-1s that run Microsoft Windows.

Asus Transformer Book Flip TP200

Asus Transformer Book Flip TP300

Asus Transformer Book Flip TP500

Asus Transformer Book Flip TP550

References 

ASUS Products
Asus products
Android (operating system) devices
Consumer electronics brands
Tablet computers
2-in-1 PCs